Andrés Llamas Acuña, known as Andrés Llamas (born 7 May 1998) is an Italian footballer who plays as a defender. He is of Spanish descent.

Club career
He appeared on the bench once for Milan early in the 2015–16 Serie A season, but then was moved back to the youth team.

He made his Serie C debut for Pistoiese on 16 September 2018 in a game against Pro Patria.

On 26 January 2021, he signed with Carpi.

International
He was the captain of Italy national under-17 football team at the 2015 UEFA European Under-17 Championship.

References

External links
 

1998 births
Italian people of Spanish descent
Footballers from Milan
Living people
Italian footballers
Italy youth international footballers
Association football defenders
A.C. Milan players
U.S. Pistoiese 1921 players
A.C. Carpi players
Serie C players